Scott O'Donell (born 16 June 1967) is Technical Director of the FAM in January 2022, Scott O'Donell was appointed by the Football Association of Malaysia as their new technical director replacing Ong Kim Swee who tendered his resignation on October 4, 2021 after accepting the position as the new head coach of Sabah. He is a former director of coach education for the Asian Football Confederation. He was S. League Coach of the Year 2003.

References

External links
 nterview: Former Coach Scott O’Donell on football in Cambodia
 Q & A with Cambodia national team coach Scott O'Donell
 Career Statistics at OzFootball

1967 births
Living people
Australian soccer players
National Soccer League (Australia) players
Sydney United 58 FC players
Expatriate footballers in Malaysia
Napier City Rovers FC players
Parramatta FC players
Cambodia national football team managers
Expatriate footballers in Singapore
Singapore Premier League players
Tampines Rovers FC players
Hougang United FC players
Kuala Lumpur City F.C. players
Geylang International FC head coaches
Singapore Premier League head coaches
Association football defenders
Australian soccer coaches
Soccer players from Sydney
Australian expatriate soccer coaches